Ivanchikovo is a rural locality and the administrative center of Ivanchikovsky Selsoviet Rural Settlement, Lgovsky District, Kursk Oblast, Russia. Population:

Geography 
The village is located on the Kochetna Brook (a left tributary of the Prutishche in the basin of the Seym), 60 km from the Russia–Ukraine border, 59 km west of Kursk, 8 km north-east of the district center – the town Lgov.

 Climate
Ivanchikovo has a warm-summer humid continental climate (Dfb in the Köppen climate classification).

Transport 
Ivanchikovo is located 14 km from the road of regional importance  (Kursk – Lgov – Rylsk – border with Ukraine) as part of the European route E38, 5 km from the road  (Lgov – Konyshyovka), 15.5 km from the road of intermunicipal significance  (38K-017 – Nikolayevka – Shirkovo), on the road  (38K-023 – Olshanka – Marmyzhi – 38N-362), 5 km from the nearest railway halt 565 km (railway line Navlya – Lgov-Kiyevsky).

The rural locality is situated 65 km from Kursk Vostochny Airport, 149 km from Belgorod International Airport and 268 km from Voronezh Peter the Great Airport.

References

Notes

Sources

Rural localities in Lgovsky District